Edson may refer to:

Places

Canada
 Edson, Alberta

United States
 Edson, Kansas, an unincorporated community
 Edson, South Dakota, a ghost town
 Edson, Wisconsin, a town
 Edson (community), Wisconsin, an unincorporated community

People

Given name
 Édson, a Brazilian given name, often written as Edson
 Edson (footballer, born 1977), Brazilian footballer
 Edson (footballer, born 1987), Brazilian footballer
 Edson (footballer, born 1990), Brazilian footballer
 Edson (footballer, born 1991), Brazilian footballer
 Edson (footballer, born 1998), Brazilian footballer
 Edson Álvarez (born 1997), Mexican footballer
 Edson Arantes do Nascimento (1940–2022), Brazilian footballer, better known by his nickname Pelé
 Edson Braafheid (born 1983), Dutch footballer
 Edson Buddle (born 1981), American soccer player
 Edson Minga (born 1979), Congolese born Hong Kong footballer
 Edson B. Olds (1802–1869), American politician
 Edson A. Putnam (1832–1917), American politician
 Edson Warner (born 1930), Canadian sports figure
 Edson White (1849–1928), American Seventh-day Adventist and publisher

Surname
 Allan Edson (1846–1888), Canadian painter
 Billy Edson (1874–1965), football player, lawyer, and politician in Iowa
 C. L. Edson (1881–1975), American newspaper columnist, humorist, and poet
 Carroll A. Edson (1891–1986), early leader in the Boy Scouts of America; co-founder of the Order of the Arrow scouting honor society
 Charles Edson (1864–1936), American composer
 Evelyn Edson (born 1940), American medievalist and historian of cartography
 Fanny Carter Edson (1887–1952), American geologist
 Franklin Edson (1832–1904), 85th Mayor of New York
 Gary Edson, president of Conservation International
 Gus Edson (1901–1966), American cartoonist (originally "Edelstein")
 Hilary Edson (born 1965), American soap opera actress
 Hiram Edson (1806–1882), pioneer of the Seventh-day Adventist Church
 J. T. Edson (1928–2014), English author of American Westerns
 Jerrod Edson (born 1974), Canadian novelist
 Job A. Edson (1854–1928), president of the Kansas City Southern Railway
 John Joy Edson, American banker
 Katherine Philips Edson (1870–1933), American labor and women's rights activist
 Lewis Edson (1748–1820), early American composer
 Marcellus Gilmore Edson (1849–1940), Canadian pharmacist who was the first person to patent peanut butter
 Margaret Edson (born 1961), American playwright
 Merritt A. Edson (1897–1955), U.S. Marine Corps General
 Mike Edson (born 1942), British Church of England clergyman
 Norman Lowther Edson (1904–1970), New Zealander biochemist
 Rich Edson (born 1981), American journalist
 Richard Edson (born 1954), American actor
 Russell Edson (1935–2014), American poet, novelist, writer and illustrator
 Susan Ann Edson (1823–1897), American doctor and personal physician to James A. Garfield
 William Alden Edson (1912–2012), American scientist and engineer

Other
 Edson Range, a rifle range at Camp Pendleton, near Oceanside, California
 , a destroyer of the United States Navy